Gyptitia is a genus of moths of the family Crambidae. It contains only one species, Gyptitia gonialis, which is found on Sulawesi.

References

Pyraustinae
Crambidae genera
Taxa named by Pieter Cornelius Tobias Snellen